Al-Damen is a Syrian village located in Douma District. Al-Damen had a population of 3,571 in the 2004 census.

References

Populated places in Douma District
Villages in Syria